The first season of House premiered November 16, 2004, and ended May 24, 2005. The season follows Dr. Gregory House and his team as they solve a medical case each episode. The season's sub-plot revolves around billionaire Edward Vogler making a $100 million donation to the hospital. Through this donation, Vogler becomes the new chairman of the board and orders House to fire one of his team members. Vogler does this to show House he can control him: "I need to know that whatever I ask you to do, however distasteful you find it, you'll do it".

Chi McBride joined the cast as Vogler in five episodes of the season. His character was brought in after Universal Studios president Jeff Zucker threatened that the season would be cut short by six episodes if a "boss" character wasn't added. While there were possibilities of the character returning, he was generally disliked by viewers and critics and therefore not brought back to the show. Sela Ward, who would return as the main recurring character of season two, appeared in the final two episodes as Stacy Warner, House's former girlfriend.

Cast and characters

Main cast
 Hugh Laurie as Dr. Gregory House
 Lisa Edelstein as Dr. Lisa Cuddy
 Omar Epps as Dr. Eric Foreman
 Robert Sean Leonard as Dr. James Wilson
 Jennifer Morrison as Dr. Allison Cameron
 Jesse Spencer as Dr. Robert Chase

Recurring cast
 Chi McBride as Edward Vogler
 Sela Ward as Stacy Warner
 Stephanie Venditto as Nurse Brenda Previn
 Kenneth Choi as Dr. Lim
 Ron Perkins as Dr. Ron Simpson
 Currie Graham as Mark Warner
 Maurice Godin as Dr. Lawrence Hourani

Guest cast
Andrew Airlie, John Patrick Amedori, Skye McCole Bartusiak, Patrick Bauchau, Nicole Bilderback, Brandy, Hedy Burress, Nestor Carbonell, Ever Carradine, John Cho, Sarah Clarke, David Conrad, Christina Cox, Missy Crider, Myndy Crist, Nicholas D'Agosto, Ann Dowd, Stacy Edwards, Carmen Electra, Cynthia Ettinger, Scott Foley, Erin Foster, Kurt Fuller, Wendy Gazalle, Michael A. Goorjian, Peter Graves, Stanislav Grof, Mark Harelik, Roxanne Hart, David Henrie, Aaron Himelstein, Marin Hinkle, Leslie Hope, Lucinda Jenney, Andrew Keegan, Shirley Knight, Harry Lennix, Eddie McClintock, Scott Mechlowicz, Tracy Middendorf, Elizabeth Mitchell, Meredith Monroe, Joe Morton, Danny Nucci, Faith Prince, Dominic Purcell, Daryl Sabara, Amanda Seyfried, Alex Skuby, Jennifer Stone, Robin Thomas, Sam Trammell, Robin Tunney, Kristoffer Ryan Winters, Kevin Zegers and Josh Zuckerman.

Reception
Season one gained high Nielsen ratings, averaging 13.3 million viewers an episode. It was 24th most-watched television show of the 2004–2005 television season.

Hugh Laurie submitted the episode "Detox" for consideration at the 57th Primetime Emmy Awards in 2005. This resulted in his first Emmy Award nomination, for Outstanding Lead Actor in a Drama Series for his role as Dr. Gregory House.

Episodes

Home media

The Region 1 DVD set of Season 1 was issued in non-anamorphic widescreen (meaning those with widescreen TVs would have to use the Zoom button for the show to fit their screen properly, causing the picture to be blurry) on 3 double-sided discs. However, Universal reissued the Season 1 set on February 10, 2009, in the correct anamorphic widescreen aspect ratio, which is now on 6 single-sided discs instead of the 3 double-sided ones.

References 
General
 
 

Specific

Further reading

External links 

 
 House recaps at televisionwithoutpity.com
 House episodes information at film.com
 List of House episodes at TVGuide.com
 

 
2004 American television seasons
2005 American television seasons